The  or Kamakura Museum or Kamakura National Treasure House is a museum located on the grounds of Tsurugaoka Hachiman-gū in Yukinoshita, Kamakura, Kanagawa Prefecture, Japan. The museum houses around 4800 objects from the Kamakura region including sculptures, paintings and industrial art objects. Most of these works originate from the Kamakura and Muromachi periods, spanning from the 12th to the 16th century. Some of the items were produced in China and imported to Japan.

Name
The term "National Treasure" in the museum's name refers to "old" National Treasures of Japan, term which denoted all the state-designated Cultural Properties of Japan before the Law for the Protection of Cultural Properties came into force on August 29, 1950. All of the old national treasures became Important Cultural Properties and some of them have been designated as (new) National Treasures since June 9, 1951. From a current perspective the name refers to a museum housing both Important Cultural Properties and National Treasures.

History
The Kamakura Museum of National Treasure was founded in April 1928 to protect important art works after the 1923 Great Kantō earthquake. The building, which was constructed in the same year, was modeled after the Shōsōin treasure house of Tōdai-ji, Nara. The items which had been moved returned in May 1946.

In October 1952, the museum came under the jurisdiction of the newly established Kamakura City Board of Education. The  was established in the museum in October 1974. In 1983 the museum's annex storage room was completed, and in May 2000 the main building was designated as a Registered Tangible Cultural Property.

Main Building
The main building is a two-story reinforced concrete construction with tile-roofing and a building area of about 800 m2. There is no basement. The construction resembles the raised-floor-style of an ancient log storehouse. From the outside the building resembles Nara's Shōsōin treasure house, while techniques from Kamakura period temples have been employed on the interior. The ground floor is used as storage, while the second floor contains a single exhibition hall spanning almost 600 m2.

Annex
The annex is connected to the main building via a walkway on the second floor. Like the main building it is a two-story reinforced concrete construction featuring two floors above ground and a basement, with rooms for repairs and machines. The ground floor contains offices and the room of the curator, while the second floor is used as storage space.

Highlights of the Collection
The Kamakura Museum houses five National Treasures of Japan, 73 items designated as "Important Cultural Property", and other works of art. There are about 100 nikuhitsuga ukiyo-e paintings in the "Ujiie Ukiyo-e Collection".

National Treasures

Hanging scroll, 104.8 cm x 46.4 cm, light color on silk. Kamakura period, 1271. Lent by Kenchō-ji.
A Chinese chan (zen) master, Lanxi, is depicted sitting on a chair. The scroll carries an inscription on the upper part written by Lanxi himself.

Two handscrolls (Emakimono), 51.5 cm x 796.7 cm and 51.5 cm x 689.8 cm, color on paper. Kamakura period. Lent by Kōmyō-ji.

Lacquer box with maki-e decorations, 26.0 cm x 24.1 cm. Kamakura period. Lent by Tsurugaoka Hachiman-gū.
The case was a gift to Minamoto no Yoritomo from Emperor Go-Shirakawa.

, 35 items from the Kamakura period lent by Tsurugaoka Hachiman-gū, including:
 one 
 30  (one arrow shaft is missing)
 one 
Height: 32.7 cm.
 two  (one with sword guard missing)
Length: 105.8 cm.
 one 

Two scrolls, 85.2 cm x 41.4 cm (sermon) and 85.5 cm x 40.7 cm (regulations), ink on paper. Kamakura period, 13th century. Lent by Kenchō-ji.
The two scrolls were written by Lanxi Daolong (jap.: Rankei Dōryū, posthumous name: Daikaku Zenji).

See also
List of National Treasures of Japan (paintings)
List of National Treasures of Japan (crafts-others)

References

Art museums and galleries in Japan
Museums in Kanagawa Prefecture
Museums of Japanese art
Buildings and structures in Kamakura, Kanagawa
Art museums established in 1928
1928 establishments in Japan